Evciler is a village in the Gölhisar District of Burdur Province in Turkey. Its population is 287 (2021). The village to the west is Asmalı.

References

Villages in Gölhisar District